Stensholmen is a small island (or skerry) lying  off the west coast of Sweden, in the locality of Fjällbacka, and is part of the islands of Bohuslän.

War graves
It is the last resting place of a number of British and German sailors killed in the Battle of Jutland during the First World War and subsequently washed up on and around the island, including the author Gorch Fock (real name Johann Wilhelm Kinau). The war-grave on Stensholmen was established in 1920 and currently is the resting ground of 12 German sailors. The graveyard is managed by the German Volksbund Deutsche Kriegsgräberfürsorge organisation. In June 2016 the island was visited by a Volksbund travel group in order to restore the graves in celebration of the 100th anniversary of the battle. In August 2020 the island was visited by the German sailing ship Alexander von Humboldt II to pay honour to the dead sailors.

Transport
Stensholmen is only accessible by boat from the port of Fjällbacka, which it is situated a few kilometres away from. The journey takes roughly 20 minutes. Stensholmen neighbours the island of Kalvö, which is inhabited by three people.

See also 
 List of islands of Sweden

References

Islands of Västra Götaland County